Jafus White (born April 16, 1957 in Cameron, Texas) is a former American football and Canadian football defensive back.  He was drafted with the 253rd pick of the 1980 NFL Draft in the 10th round by the Green Bay Packers, but never made the roster.  His professional career included two games for the Toronto Argonauts of the Canadian Football League (CFL) in 1981, and he also played for the San Antonio Gunslingers of the United States Football League (USFL).

References

1957 births
Living people
People from Cameron, Texas
American football defensive backs
Texas A&M–Kingsville Javelinas football players
American players of Canadian football
Canadian football defensive backs
Toronto Argonauts players
San Antonio Gunslingers players